Carlton Schroeder is an American jazz pianist who was an accompanist to Sarah Vaughan in the 1960s and 1970s. Schroeder taught at the Musician's Institute in Los Angeles, California from the 1980s until his retirement in 2015. Schroeder has also played with the likes of Art Blakey, Howard Roberts, Roy Haynes, Joe Henderson, Michael Brecker and Chick Corea.

Harmony & Theory Instruction Book

In 1988, Carl Schroeder co-authored with Keith Wyatt, another long-term instructor at Musicians Institute, an instruction book called "Harmony & Theory - A Comprehensive Source For All Musicians."   The book came out of the many years Mr. Schroeder taught the immensely popular course Harmony and Theory first at G.I.T., the legendary school which became Musicians Institute on Hollywood Boulevard.  The book is unique in its approach by including all forms of music.  Major, minor, Pentatonic scales, modes, intervals, key centers, secondary dominants, altered chords, altered scales, flat five substitution, modulation and more are given ample space, effectively covering key topics in this critical musical subject.

Jam Session With Howard Roberts
Howard Roberts was one of the greatest legendary Jazz guitar players ever.  He combined his musical virtuosity with a revolutionary way of teaching music.   Mr. Roberts was hardly captured live during his career.   Here he performs at G.I.T (circa 1980) with Carl Schroeder on keyboards.
https://www.youtube.com/watch?v=h76NVQjwRR0

Partial discography
 itself  Carlton Schroeder Trio (2010)
 Bonita (with Joe Diorio, 1980)
 Tenor Sax Jazz Impressions (with Bob Cooper, 1979)
With Roy Haynes
 Senyah (1971)
 Hip Ensemble (1973)
With Sarah Vaughan
 Live in Belgrade (2009)
 Ronnie Scott's Presents Sarah Vaughan Live (1977)
 Live in Prague (2007)
 Live in Japan (1973)
 Live at Laren Jazz Festival 1975, The Lost Recordings (1975)

References

American jazz pianists
American male pianists
Year of birth missing (living people)
Living people
21st-century American pianists
21st-century American male musicians
American male jazz musicians